Scott Rand may refer to:

* Scott Rand (darts player) (born 1975), English darts player 
 Scott Rand (rower) (born 1968), Canadian rower